Established on 16 April 1964 as the Pacific Fleet Polaris Material Office (PMOPAC), the Priority Material Office (PMO) is headquartered at Naval Base Kitsap, Bremerton, Washington. PMO is a U.S. Naval command under the operational control of the Commander, Submarine Force, U. S. Pacific Fleet (COMSUBPAC). PMO is charged with providing dedicated logistics support to Pacific and Atlantic Fleet submarine forces, surface ship forces, Marine Corps, Coast Guard, and Military Sealift Command (MSC) units.



Mission
PMO is a command solely dedicated to cradle-to-grave expediting and tracking, around the globe. Of all Issue Priority Group One requisitions for the Pacific and Atlantic Fleet submarine forces, surface ship forces, Marine Corps, Coast Guard, and MSC units, while maintaining accurate, real-time in-transit visibility to customers and their decision-makers.

PMO is dedicated to perform assigned material control and supply support responsibilities for the TRIDENT submarine operating forces assigned to Commander, Submarine Forces (COMSUBFOR), and act as the focal point for logistics support of deployable Navy, Marine Corps, Coast Guard, and Military Sealift Command units.

History
The Priority Material Office (PMO) initially commissioned as the Pacific Fleet Polaris Material Office (PMOPAC) on 16 April 1964. It has served since its inception under the operational control of Commander, Submarine Force, U.S. Pacific Fleet (COMSUBPAC), and was originally established to support the Fleet Ballistic Missile (FBM) submarines and their tenders. In 1982, PMOPAC began expediting critical repair parts for both ashore and afloat commands of the entire Pacific Submarine Fleet. In 1994, PMOPAC was renamed the Submarine Logistics Support Center (SUBLOGSUPPCEN) to better reflect its changing mission. In this expanded role, SUBLOGSUPPCEN developed Prime, a specialized web-based application which provides current and historical information on every requisition processed. In 1998, SUBLOGSUPPCEN’s customer base further expanded, expediting for the Pacific Fleet surface ships and MSC. In April 2000 the command was renamed “Priority Material Office” to better reflect its new, broader mission.

Vision
The future at PMO is as dynamic and challenging as ever. As the Navy’s most robust expediting organization, PMO stands ready to “find the parts … to fix the weapons systems … that put ordnance on target.”

“We will become the premier material expediting Center of Excellence for both the Pacific and Atlantic Fleets (or globally) by ensuring the rapid movement of critical repair parts and the timely flow of information to customers and the decision makers.”

Subordinate organizations

East Region detachments
PMO Det. Norfolk, Virginia
PMO Det. Groton, Connecticut
PMO Det. Kings Bay, George
PMO Det. Mayport, Florida
PMO Det. Manama, Bahrain
PMO Det. Sigonella, Sicily
PMO Det. Susquehanna, Pennsylvania

West Region detachments
PMO Det. Pearl Harbor, Hawaii
PMO Det. San Diego, California
PMO Det. Yokosuka, Japan
PMO Det. Agana, Guam
PMO Det. Travis AFB, California

Commanding Officers/Officers-in-Charge serving at PMO

Officers-in-Charge
Capt S.L. Scharf, Jr. 1964 - 1967
Capt J.H. Kamps 1967 - 1970
Capt R.C. Bliss 1970 - 1974
LCDR S.W. Baldwin 1974 - 1975
Capt S.J. Deroches 1975
CDR D.D. Leeson 1975 - 1978
CDR C.R. Kiger 1978 - 1979
LCDR D.S. Bary 1979
CDR W.E. Redman 1979 - 1981
CDR R.C. Rieve 1981 - 1983
CDR R.E. Lewis 1983 - 1984

Commanding Officers
CDR R.E. Lewis 1984 - 1985
CDR B.A. Colvin 1985 - 1987
CDR J.E. Schweichler 1987 - 1991
CDR P.M. Evans 1991 - 1994
LCDR M.R. Bonnette 1994 - 1997
CDR J.P. Costello 1997 - 2000
CDR W.G. Baker 2000 - 2003
CDR J.K. Grimes 2003 - 2006
CDR J.B. Haynes 2006 - 2009
CDR M.D. Havens 2009 - 2012
CDR J.C. Statler 2012 – 2015
CDR P.W. DeMeyer 2015–2018
CDR J.P. Holdorf 2018-2021
CDR R. D. Salire 2021-Present

References

Links
 Official site

United States Navy organization